5F-AB-PINACA is an indazole-based synthetic cannabinoid that is derived from a series of compounds originally developed by Pfizer in 2009 as an analgesic medication, and has been sold online as a designer drug.

5F-AB-PINACA has been reported to be a potent agonist of the CB1 receptor and CB2 receptor with EC50 values of 0.48 nM and 2.6 nM respectively. Its metabolism has been described in literature.

Legality

China
As of October 2015 5F-AB-PINACA is a controlled substance in China.

Germany
5F-AB-PINACA is an Anlage II controlled substance in Germany as of May 2015.

Singapore
It is also controlled under the Fifth Schedule of the Misuse of Drugs Act (MDA) in Singapore as of May 2015.

See also 

 5F-ADB
 5F-AMB
 5F-CUMYL-PINACA
 AB-FUBINACA
 AB-CHFUPYCA
 AB-PINACA
 ADB-CHMINACA
 ADB-FUBINACA
 ADB-PINACA
 ADBICA
 APICA
 APINACA
 MDMB-CHMICA
 PX-3

References 

Cannabinoids
Designer drugs
Indazolecarboxamides
Organofluorides
CB1 receptor agonists
CB2 receptor agonists